Galen is the surname of:

People
 Albert J. Galen (1876–1936), Justice of the Montana Supreme Court
 Louis Galen (1925–2007), American banker, CEO and philanthropist
 Rich Galen (born 1946), American columnist, Republican strategist and former press secretary
 Robert S. Galen (born 1946), physician, Professor Emeritus Epidemiology and former Senior Associate Dean in the College of Public Health at the University of Georgia

Fictional characters
 Dr. Galén, in Karel Čapek's play The White Disease and in its movie adaptation Skeleton on Horseback
 Richard Galen, in the Star Trek: The Next Generation episode "The Chase"

See also 
 Galen family